Churails is a 2020 ZEE5 exclusive and Zindagi Original Pakistani drama web series. It is written and directed by Asim Abbasi. The web series stars Sarwat Gilani, Mehar Bano, Nimra Bucha and Yasra Rizvi in lead roles. It is produced by Asim Abbasi along with Mo Azmi and Shailja Kejriwal. It revolves around Karachi's secret detectives whose mission it is to expose the city's unfaithful, elite husbands. It became available for streaming on the OTT platform ZEE5 on 11 August 2020.

Premise 
The series focuses on the lives of four women: Sara (Sarwat Gilani), a lawyer that gave her career up to be the "perfect wife", Jugnu (Yasra Rizvi), a wedding planner, Zubaida (Mehar Bano), a boxer seeking independence and love, and Batool (Nimra Bucha), an ex-convict who was sentenced to twenty years in prison for murder. Their lives become intertwined when Sara discovers her husband cheating on her, after which the four decide to set up an agency to catch cheating husbands in action. They run this agency covertly under the guise of a retail burka store called "Halal Designs", and call themselves Churails. When one of them goes missing, their investigation leads them to something much bigger than themselves, dominated by Karachi's most powerful.

Cast

Main cast 
 Sarwat Gilani as Sara Khan
 Mehar Bano as Zubaida
 Nimra Bucha as Batool Jan
 Yasra Rizvi as Jugnu Chaudhry

Recurring cast 
 Meher Jaffri as Laila 
 Omair Rana as Jamil Khan
 Adnan Malik as KK 
 Eman Suleman as Mehak Hussain
 Dimeji Ewuoso as Jackson 
 Sarmad Sultan Khoosat as Ehtisham Khalid  
 Sania Saeed as Shehnaz Khalid
 Shabana Hassan as Resham
 Mareeha Safdar as Sheila
 Amtul Baweja as Munni
 Zara Khan as Baby Doll
 Bakhtawar Mazhar as Pinky
 Sameena Nazir as Babli
 Hina Khawaja Bayat as Sherry
 Kashif Hussain as Shams
 Fawad Khan as Inspector Jamshed
 Sarmed Aftab Jadraan as Dilbar
 Adnan Shah Tipu

Guest appearances 
 Mahira Khan as Shagufta (Arms Dealer)
 Anoushay Abbasi
 Fahad Mirza
 Frieha Altaf as Botox Lady (Party Lady)
 Nadia Afgan
 Faiza Gillani
 Alycia Dias
 Tara Mahmood as Shumailla

Episodes

Season 1

Production

Development 
The web series was announced in the first quarter of 2019 to be directed by Asim Abbasi.

Filming 
Principal photography commenced with the lead actors Sarwat Gilani, Mehar Bano, Nimra Bucha, Yasra Rizvi and they had been spotted shooting in summer 2019.

Director Asim Abbasi announced the wrap up of web series "Churails" using his Instagram post on 4 September 2019.

Marketing and release

Promotion 
The official trailer of the web series was launched on 31 July 2020 by ZEE5 on YouTube.

Release 
Churails was released on ZEE5, an Indian streaming platform available to audiences across the world. The series started streaming from 11 August 2020.

Reception 
Churails has received widespread critical acclaim. It has been hailed as a groundbreaking series that breaks stereotypes about Pakistanis and abandons oft-used tropes in Pakistani television. It has been lauded for its portrayal of three-dimensional women as well as for exploring social dynamics in a diverse city like Karachi, portraying women across social classes and backgrounds.

Furthermore, it has been praised for its sensitive and nuanced depictions of LGBTQ characters, with gay men, lesbian women and transgender characters. Abbasi said, "Because we are showing such a diverse range of women, it was important to show the entire spectrum of sexuality. It would have been wrong if they were all straight because not all women in Pakistan are straight."

Shaheera Anwar at The Express Tribune gave the series 4.5/5 stars, writing "Without compromising on the storytelling, Churails is a feminist masterpiece."

Shubhra Gupta at The Indian Express wrote: "To watch free-spirited, cussing-out-loud, hockey-sticks and rifle-toting, burqa-clad women beating the bejesus out of violent, murderous men, is one of the high points of Churails".

Streaming removal and reinstatement 

In October 2020, the series was briefly removed from streaming on ZEE5 without explanation, reportedly in response to complaints from the Pakistan Electronic Media Regulatory Authority (PEMRA) and Pakistan Telecommunication Authority (PTA). However, the series returned to the streaming platform within a day or two. ZEE5 released a statement regarding the removal and reinstatement: "The show was taken off the platform in Pakistan purely in compliance with a directive that we received. We have now addressed the matter and reinstated the show on our platform."

References

External links 
 
 Churails on Zee5

2020 web series debuts
2020 Pakistani television series debuts
Pakistani drama television series
Zee Zindagi original programming
Urdu-language television shows
Pakistani mystery films